The Maritime Centre, in Downtown Halifax, Nova Scotia, Canada, is an office building, home to the regional telecommunications company Bell Aliant (formerly the Maritime Telegraph and Telephone Company, after which it is named). The main entrance to the building sits on the prominent corner of Barrington Street and Spring Garden Road.

History

Planning and construction
The project was launched in an effort to consolidate various MT&T departments and offices. In 1972, the company had around 1,100 administrative staff working from over a dozen locations in Halifax. MT&T already owned land at the corner of Spring Garden Road and Barrington Street, and the Capitol Theatre was for sale, allowing the company to enlarge the site.

On 7November 1973, MT&T announced that they would purchase and demolish the theatre, which was at that time the largest auditorium with a stage in Halifax. A citizen's group called "Save the Capitol Society" was quickly formed. The group tried to ensure that the theatre would be preserved within the redevelopment, but these efforts were to no avail. The theatre was demolished in 1974 to make way for the construction of the present tower. 

The Maritime Centre development was announced in May 1974 by MT&T, which would continue to own the land and would be the main tenant of the building, and developer Trizec Equities, whose proposal was selected in a competitive process. Construction was delayed by the discovery of a rock fault beneath the site, which compelled the developers to undertake costly remedial action to protect the adjacent St. Matthew's Church.

The general contractor and project manager for the building's construction was Robert McAlpine Ltd. of Halifax. George Brandys & Associates Ltd. was the structural engineer.

The first phase of the development, comprising a shopping centre, mezzanine and 12 office floors, was opened on 1 August 1977.

1980s expansion
Under the agreement with MT&T, Trizec possessed an option to add another seven or eight floors within 8.5 years. A building permit for the addition was issued in June 1982, and construction began later that year. The first phase of the tower had included extra, empty elevator shafts that were put into service with the expansion of the building, estimated in 1982 to cost C$24 million. The same principal consultants that had worked on phase one of the complex were also employed on the addition project, namely: Webb Zerafa Menkes Housden (architecture firm), George Brandys & Associates (structural engineer), and Robert McAlpine Ltd. (general contractor).

Ownership
In 1995, Trizec sold the complex, as well as the nearby Centennial Building, to Fortis Properties of St. John's, which paid C$42 million for the two buildings.

On October 13, 2015, Fortis Inc. announced that it had sold its commercial real estate portfolio, including Maritime Centre, to Slate Office REIT.

Design

The complex was designed by architects Webb Zerafa Menkes Housden of Toronto and Dumaresq and Byrne of Halifax. Completed in 1977, the original structure had 14 storeys; another seven floors were added in 1988. The building stands at 78 metres and has 21 floors, including the two retail levels. It is notable for the strong wind tunnel effect it creates at street level.

Maritime Centre was designed to avoid blocking the view from Citadel Hill to various parts of Halifax Harbour, hence the building's peculiar angle to the street.

The lower levels of the building were renovated from late 2019 to 2022. The plazas and steps in front of the building entrances, along Barrington Street, were replaced with expanded lobby, vestibule, and retail areas. The design of the expansion project was intended to improve pedestrian comfort on Barrington Street by breaking up high winds above street level.

See also
 List of tallest buildings in Halifax, Nova Scotia

Further reading

References

External links

 

1977 establishments in Nova Scotia
Bell Aliant
Buildings and structures in Halifax, Nova Scotia
Modernist architecture in Canada
Office buildings completed in 1977
Terminating vistas in Canada
WZMH Architects buildings